The Homeland Security Distinguished Service Medal is a military decoration of the Department of Homeland Security, which is presented to United States Armed Forces servicemembers for exceptionally meritorious service. The current version of the medal was established in February 2003, retroactive to March 1, 2002.

It is equivalent to the United States Department of Defense's Defense Distinguished Service Medal.

History
On February 28, 2003, President George W. Bush signed , which, among other things, replaced the Transportation version of the award with the Homeland Security version retroactively to March 1, 2002. On April 5, 2011, President Barack Obama amended Executive Order 12824, as amended, modifying the award eligibility from "a member of the Coast Guard" to "any member of the Armed Forces of the United States".

Order of precedence 
As a distinguished service medal, this decoration is one of the highest awards that can be bestowed upon a member of the U.S. Armed Forces.

The award would be worn after the Medal of Honor, Distinguished Service Cross, Navy Cross, Air Force Cross and Coast Guard Cross and, for members of the Coast Guard, before the Defense Distinguished Service Medal and any of the service-specific Distinguished Service Medals from the other armed services. For members of the all other military services, the Homeland Security Distinguished Service Medal is worn before the service-specific DSMs but after the Defense Distinguished Service Medal. The medal may be awarded to any member of the Armed Forces of the United States.

Notable recipients

Admiral Thad W. Allen, first recipient in 2006 for his service in response to Hurricane Katrina, subsequent award in 2010 at the end of his term as Commandant of the Coast Guard
Admiral Thomas H. Collins, in 2006 at the end of his term as Commandant of the Coast Guard
Vice Admiral Vivien Crea, in 2009 at the end of her term as Vice Commandant of the Coast Guard
General Craig R. McKinley, in 2012 at the end of his tenure as the Chief of the National Guard Bureau
Admiral Charles D. Michel, in 2018 at the end of his term as Vice-Commandant of the Coast Guard
Admiral Robert J. Papp, in 2014 at the end of his term as Commandant of the Coast Guard
Vice Admiral David Pekoske, in 2010 at the end of his term as Vice Commandant of the United States Coast Guard
Admiral Paul F. Zukunft, in 2011 for his service in response to the Deepwater Horizon oil spill and in 2018 at the end of his term as Commandant of the Coast Guard
Admiral Karl L. Schultz, in 2022 at the end of his term as Commandant of the Coast Guard

See also 
 Awards and decorations of the United States military
 Inter-service awards and decorations of the United States military
 Distinguished Service Medals

References

External links

Distinguished Service Medal, Homeland Security
Awards established in 2003

2003 establishments in the United States